Marc Nguyen Tan (born 1974), known professionally as Colder, is a French dance musician and graphic designer who is also a DJ and remixer who remains actively involved in dance music and other projects.

Colder's sound is rooted in the post-punk and post-disco of the late 1970s and early 1980s. Colder is also influenced by dub and krautrock.

Biography
After studying film at university, Tan started to work as junior art director in 1995 for Grolier Interactive, then became art director at the Shaman design studio. He worked as art director for TV on-air design, then directed promos and title sequences as a freelancer for Eurosport cable channel. He co-founded "Le Cabinet. Paris." with Benoit Emery in May 2000.

To date, Tan has released five studio albums under the Colder moniker: Again in July 2003, Heat in July 2005, Many Colours in November 2015, and Goodbye and The Rain, both released simultaneously in June 2016.

As Colder, Tan provided a remix for Depeche Mode's song "Clean" for their 2004 Remixes 81–04 album.

Discography

Albums
 Again (7 July 2003)
 Heat (4 July 2005)
 Many Colours (6 November 2015)
 The Rain (24 June 2016)
 Goodbye (24 June 2016)

Singles & EPs
 "Shiny Star" (28 April 2003)
 "Crazy Love" (10 November 2003)
 "Wrong Baby" (27 June 2005)
 "To the Music" (6 February 2006)
 "Turn Your Back" (25 May 2015)
 "Midnight Fever" (22 June 2015)
 "Your Kind" (18 December 2015)
 Some Lost Tapes EP (16 April 2016)
 Black Magic EP (collaboration with Kasper Bjørke) (15 September 2017)

References

External links
Colder Interview by Alexander Laurence
 Discogs biography

French electronic musicians
French dance musicians
1974 births
Living people
Remixers
Trip hop musicians